August Karl Graf von Dönhoff-Friedrichstein (26 January 1845 – 9 September 1920)  was a Prussian nobleman and politician.

Life 
Born in Frankfurt Dönhoff descended from the East Prussian branch of the Dönhoff. His father was the diplomat and Prussian foreign minister August Heinrich Hermann von Dönhoff, his mother Pauline, née Countess von Lehndorff. Dönhoff grew up on the family castle Friedrichstein not far from Königsberg and attended the Kneiphof Gymnasium. After the Abitur he studied law at the Rheinische Friedrich-Wilhelms-Universität Bonn. In 1865 he became a member of the Corps Borussia Bonn. As a Prussian major he took part in the Austro-Prussian War at the age of 21. From 1868 to 1870 he was an articled clerk at the Kammergericht and then served again as a major in the Franco-Prussian War. Like his father, Dönhoff also embarked on a diplomatic career and worked as secretary of legation for the Empire in Paris, Vienna, London, Saint Petersburg and Washington. In Washington he made friends with the Interior Minister Carl Schurz and accompanied him on an adventurous journey to the American West. Dönhoff laid down his diplomatic duties when, after his father's death in 1874, he took over his hereditary seat in the Prussian House of Lords. At the 1881 German federal election he moved as representative of the German Conservative Party into the Reichstag (German Empire). He belonged to this group until 1903, representing the interests of the East Elbian nobility and large estates. In 1906 he became a Prussian landowner. In 1917 August von Dönhoff was one of the founding members of the German Fatherland Party, which advocated a perseverance policy and a peace of victory in the First World War.

Family 
In 1896 Dönhoff married in Karwitz the 24 years younger Maria von Lepel (1869-1940), with whom he had eight children:
 William (d. 1897)
 Christa (1898-1924), married 1922 to Bruno Freiherr von Dellingshausen
 Heinrich Botho Eugen von Dönhoff (1899-1942), married 1938 with Dorothea Gräfin von Hatzfeldt-Wildenburg
 Yvonne Franziska Ilda (1901-1991), married in 1919 to Alexander von 
 Dietrich Wilfried Georg Karl (1902-1991), married in 1933 to Karin ("Sissi") Countess von Lehndorff
 Christoph August Bernhard (1906-1992), married 1931 to Vera Burkart
 Maria Elisabeth Helene Freda (1908-1965), born with the Down syndrome, died in the Bethel Foundation
 Marion Dönhoff (1909-2002)

Further reading 
 Kilian Heck, Christian Thielemann (edit.): Friedrichstein. Das Schloß der Grafen von Dönhoff in Ostpreußen. Deutscher Kunstverlag, München/ Berlin 2006, .
 Marion Gräfin Dönhoff: Namen, die keiner mehr nennt. Rowohlt, Reinbek 2009, .
 Eckhard Hansen,  (edit.) among others: . Volume 1: Sozialpolitiker im Deutschen Kaiserreich 1871 bis 1918. Kassel University Press, Kassel 2010,  (Online, PDF; 2,2 MB).

References

External links 
 
 

 

Members of the Reichstag of the German Empire
Members of the Prussian House of Lords
German Conservative Party politicians
German Fatherland Party politicians
19th-century German diplomats
1845 births
1920 deaths
August von Dönhoff